Lapara halicarnie is a moth of the  family Sphingidae. It is known from Florida.

The larvae probably feed on Pinus palustris and Pinus taeda.

References

Sphingini
Moths described in 1880
Taxa named by Herman Strecker